The Roman Catholic Archdiocese of Tanger is a Roman Catholic archdiocese in Morocco. Headquartered in Tangier, it is immediately subject to the Holy See.

History
 1469: Established as Diocese of Morocco from the Diocese of Ceuta in Portugal 
 1570: Suppressed (combined into the Diocese of Ceuta)
 28 November 1630: Restored as Apostolic Prefecture of Morocco. Possibly suppressed in 1649.
 14 April 1908: Promoted as Apostolic Vicariate of Morocco
 14 November 1956: Promoted as Archdiocese of Tanger

Ordinaries
Nuno Álvares de Aguiar, O.S.B. † ( 1469 – 15 Jul 1491 ) 
Diogo Ortiz de Villegas ( 1491 – 3 May 1500) 
João Lobo (4 May 1500 – 1508 ) 
Nicolau Pedro Mendes (4 Mar 1523 – 1542 ) 
Gonçalo Pinheiro (23 Nov 1542 – 27 Jun 1552 ) 
Francisco Quaresma, O.F.M. (15 Dec 1557 – 1585 ) 
Diogo Correia de Sousa (15 Jul 1585 – 16 Feb 1598 ) 
Heitor de Valadares (11 Mar 1598 – 1600 ) 
Gerónimo de Gouveia, O.F.M. (24 Jan 1601 – 1602 ) 
Agostinho Ribeiro (27 Aug 1603 – 29 Jul 1613 ) 
António de Aguiar (21 Oct 1613 – 1632 ) 
Gonçalo da Silva (6 Sep 1632 – 16 Feb 1649 )

Vicars Apostolic of Morocco 
Francisco María Cervera y Cervera, O.F.M. (8 Apr 1908 – 26 Mar 1926 ) 
José María Betanzos y Hormaechevarría, O.F.M. (17 Jul 1926 – 27 Dec 1948 )
Francisco Aldegunde Dorrego, O.F.M. (27 Dec 1948 – 14 Nov 1956 see below)

Archbishops of Tanger 
Francisco Aldegunde Dorrego, O.F.M. (see above 14 Nov 1956 – 17 Dec 1973 ) 
Carlos Amigo Vallejo, O.F.M. (17 Dec 1973 – 22 May 1982 ), appointed Archbishop of Sevilla {Seville}, Spain (Cardinal in 2003)
José Antonio Peteiro Freire, O.F.M. (2 Jul 1983 – 23 Mar 2005 ) 
Santiago Agrelo Martínez, O.F.M. (11 Apr 2007 – 24 May 2019 )

See also 
 List of Roman Catholic dioceses in Morocco
 Roman Catholic Archdiocese of Rabat

External links
 Catholic-Hierarchy

Tanger
Tangier
1469 establishments
15th-century establishments in Morocco